

Jean Cousin, also Jehan Cousin, was a 15th-century French Normand navigator who was said to have discovered the New World in 1488, four years before Christopher Columbus, when he landed in Brazil around the mouth of the Amazon. One of his captains was named Alonzo Pinzón, who left Cousin in a dispute after their return to Dieppe, and who is claimed to have left for Spain from where he advised Columbus on his westward sail. Pinzon is known to have displayed a remarkable confidence in guiding Columbus in his discovery of the New World. No indisputable written records remain however to support Cousin's claim to discovery.

Cousin's travel was succeeded by that of Binot Paulmier de Gonneville in 1504 onboard L'Espoir, which was properly recorded and brought back an Indian named Essomericq. Gonneville affirmed that when he visited Brazil, French traders from Saint-Malo and Dieppe had already been trading there for several years.

The precedent of Jean Cousin and his Normand sailors was used by Charles IX to justify the French attempts at colonizing Florida at Fort Caroline in 1564-65, as, it was said, they had discovered the New World before the Spanish did. The area was called "Terre des Bretons" by the French. 

The claim of Jean Cousin's discovery of the New World has long been reaffirmed in France. In 1660, Etienne Cleirac in Us et coustumes de la mer emphasized it. The claim is also sometimes reaffirmed in contemporary popular literature.

See also
 France-Americas relations
 Pre-Columbian trans-oceanic contact theories

Notes

References
 Ina Baghdiantz McAbe 2008 Orientalism in early Modern France Berg

External links
 Claude Lévi-Strauss: Triste Tropiques Page 86, Translated to English by John Russell, 1961

French explorers
French navigators
Pre-Columbian trans-oceanic contact
French exploration in the Age of Discovery